Eidolosaurus was a genus of mosasauroid from the Late Cretaceous period of Slovenia.

See also

 List of mosasaurs

External links
 Oceans of Kansas

Mosasaurs
Mosasaurs of Europe

zh:莫那龍